Dorothy Anderson Perkins (August 13, 1926 - December 5, 2010) was an American politician in the state of Wyoming. She served in the Wyoming House of Representatives as a member of the Republican Party.

References

1926 births
2010 deaths
People from Weiser, Idaho
Women state legislators in Wyoming
Republican Party members of the Wyoming House of Representatives
20th-century American women politicians
20th-century American politicians
21st-century American women